Daddy's Gurl is a Philippine television sitcom series broadcast by GMA Network. Directed by Chris Martinez, it stars Vic Sotto and Maine Mendoza in the title role. It premiered on October 13, 2018 on the network's Sabado Star Power sa Gabi line up replacing The Clash.

Premise
After his wife's untimely death, Barak decides to live in the condominium unit in Manila of his aspiring city girl daughter, Visitacion, in order to watch and take care of her, much to his daughter's surprise. He barely made a living for them, while he talks to the picture of his wife.

Cast and characters

Lead cast
 Vic Sotto as Barak Otogan
 Maine Mendoza as Visitacion "Stacy" Otogan

Supporting cast
 Wally Bayola as Marikit Otogan / Matilda
 Angelika Dela Cruz as Oprah Saavedra
 Oyo Boy Sotto as Lance Saavedra
 Benjie Paras as Tom
 Kevin Santos as Daboy
 Jelson Bay as Jerry
 Chichirita as Beauty
 Chamyto as himself

Guest cast

 Odette Khan as Espi Rito
 Joey Marquez as Jun
 Jak Roberto as Jonas
 Kiko Estrada as Boji
 Martin del Rosario as Romualdo "Waldo" Saavedra
 Max Collins as May Amoy
 Rodjun Cruz as Bomber
 Tuesday Vargas as Hannah Silva
 Lovi Poe as Yammy
 Glydel Mercado as Fely
 Ruffa Gutierrez as Ruffa Mae Mendoza
 Ai-Ai delas Alas as Amor Flowers
 Kendoll as Jonnaly
 Andre Paras as Burnok Onse
 Megan Young as Kim
 Mikael Daez as Kanny
 Ruru Madrid as Anton
 Barbie Forteza as Pureza
 Jason Francisco as Kevin
 Leo Martinez as Rudy
 Leah Patricio as Anna
 Kyline Alcantara as Elsa dela Cruz / Daisy
 Kakai Bautista as Tootsie
 Alden Richards as Aldrich Reyes
 Janine Gutierrez as Mina
 Alma Moreno as Vanessa
 Winwyn Marquez as Therese
 Paolo Ballesteros as Pabling / Maruya Carey
 Sanya Lopez as Cherry Aguinaldo
 Clint Bondad as Onak
 Boobsie Wonderland as Abat
 Pilita Corrales as Oprah
 Jackie Lou Blanco as Becky Belat
 Ex Battalion as themselves
 Jo Berry as Tiny
 Solenn Heussaff as Margaux Lu
 Mika dela Cruz as Hillary
 Paul Salas as Brix
 Ken Chan as Kuracho
 Baste Benedict as Chukoy
 Glaiza de Castro as Grace
 Roi Vinzon as Brusko
 Sheena Halili as Berna
 Dante Gulapa as himself
 Gladys Reyes as Malou Manay 
 Paolo Contis as Jumbo
 Sunshine Dizon as Demi Macaspac
 Thea Tolentino as Caitlyn
 Kristofer Martin as Hung Hang You
 André Paras as Burnok
 Kiray Celis as Sam
 Ed Caluag as himself
 Candy Pangilinan as Jujubi
 Danica Sotto as Lucille
 Joyce Ching as Claire
 Joey Paras as Tangerine
 Kristofer Martin as Hung Hang Yoo
 Sophie Albert as Ella
 Super Tekla as Kiko Rukuko / Lala
 Yuan Francisco as Bon Jovi
 Sunshine Teodoro as Tingting
 Caprice Cayetano as Nosbi
 Joey Reyes as himself
 Buboy Villar as Champaca
 Carlo Aquino as Marco
 Wendell Ramos as Igme
 Jason Abalos as Rudolph
 Anjo Damiles as Ipe
 Melanie Marquez as Ms. Macupad
 Via Antonio as Jingle Belle
 Boi Spencer as himself
 Ryzza Mae Dizon as Chacha
 Ricky Davao as Ceferino Escobar
 Derrick Monasterio as Pantaleon
 Ina Feleo as Blaire
 Danieca Arreglado "Teacher Dan" Goc-ong as Teacher Diva
 Rufa Mae Quinto as Joy Dibdiban
 Cherie Gil as Cherry Hills 
 Mavy Legaspi as Paul
 Boy 2 Quizon as Abdulaziz "Abdul" Alhambra
 Bianca Umali as Hazel
 Mark Bautista as Blitzen
 Lianne Valentin as Baby
 Bea Binene as Aiza
 Shamaine Buencamino as Celia
 Betong Sumaya as Mr. Cruise
 Nikki Co as Ken
 Archie Alemania as Jake
 Miggs Cuaderno as Kokoy
 Boobay as Kuya Jude
 Dustin Yu as Dustin
 Kimson Tan as Kimson
 Jenine Desiderio as Marilou
 Kokoy de Santos as Eskupido
 Wilma Doesnt as Veronique
 Matet de Leon as Sharon

Production
Principal photography was halted in March 2020 due to the enhanced community quarantine in Luzon caused by the COVID-19 pandemic. The show resumed its programming on June 13, 2020. In October 2021, John Lapus joined the series as a writer.

Ratings
According to AGB Nielsen Philippines' Nationwide Urban Television Audience Measurement People in television homes, the pilot episode of Daddy's Gurl earned a 13.6% rating.

Accolades

References

External links
 
 

2018 Philippine television series debuts
Filipino-language television shows
GMA Network original programming
Philippine comedy television series
Philippine television sitcoms
Television productions suspended due to the COVID-19 pandemic
Television series by APT Entertainment
Television series by M-Zet Productions
Television shows set in the Philippines